JRTI may refer to:

 James Rumsey Technical Institute (JRTI), Martinsburg, West Virginia, USA
 Judicial Research and Training Institute (JRTI), a legal education institution in South Korea
 Just Read the Instructions (JRtI), an autonomous spaceport drone ship of SpaceX
 Journal of Religious & Theological Information (JRTI), a theology journal